7Point8 is a skyscraper on-hold at Sudirman Avenue, Jakarta, Indonesia. The building is 298 meters tall and will have 60 floors above the ground and 5 floors below the ground. It is part of a complex of two towers, which will be linked by a multistory podium that will provide two tall exterior "walls" for the central plaza. In addition to two linked towers, the complex replicates an alun-alun, a traditional Javanese town center characterized by a walled, open-air courtyard.

Construction of the building started in 2015 and completion is expected by 2019. In addition to office, retail, commercial, residential, and public space, the complex will have direct connections to Jakarta MRT's new  station.

See also
 List of tallest buildings in Indonesia
 List of tallest buildings in Jakarta

References

External links
 7Point8

Towers in Indonesia
Buildings and structures in Jakarta
Skyscraper office buildings in Indonesia